Cannabis in Sweden is illegal for all purposes. It is illegal for recreational purposes, for most medical purposes and possession of even small amounts of cannabis is a criminal offence. Consequently, limited medical usage of cannabis-based drugs is only allowed for specific conditions.

Attitudes
Swedish singer Ängie has spoken about the attitudes towards cannabis in Sweden. In an interview in September 2016 she said, "In Sweden, it’s not ok to smoke weed [cannabis]. They’re like, ‘it’s a dangerous drug and you’re going to die.' It’s so weird. If I tell a regular boy or girl that I use it, they think I’m a real hard drug user because they don’t know the facts behind it. It’s just sad… I hate the law book here."

Medical cannabis
In Sweden, cannabis has no officially recognized medical use and medical use is not considered an extenuating circumstance. A case was covered by the national press which involved the cannabis use of a multiple sclerosis patient. In the case, the court found that the fact that she stated that cannabis helped her symptoms constituted an aggravated circumstance. The court's verdict argued that she lacked the motivation to stop using the drug and therefore gave her an unconditional jail sentence. This was despite the fact that the patient was a first-time offender, and would have normally been given a suspended sentence or a fine.

In 2008, the Medical Products Agency reported that no drugs containing cannabinoids are available, although they can have beneficial effects on symptoms like neuralgia. The cannabinoid mouth spray Sativex, which is derived from cannabis, was approved in Sweden for the treatment of spasticity as a symptom of multiple sclerosis on 22 December 2011.

In 2018, the medical use of cannabis for situations in which conventional treatment is no longer available was being examined by the European Court of Human Rights.

Reform

Some members of the Swedish Parliament, have voiced support for reforming the legal status of cannabis. During the legislature's question time on 11 January 2012, former Sweden Democrat MP William Petzäll asked Minister of Health and Social Affairs Maria Larsson if she would support the legalization of cannabis. Larsson responded in the negative on 2 February of the same year. Moderate MP Hanif Bali has also supported the legalization of cannabis to fight drug traffickers and organized crime. Liberal MP Joar Forssell is a cannabis rights activist and a strong critic of Sweden's zero-tolerance policy on drugs. The former leader of the Liberals, Nyamko Sabuni, has expressed support for the legalization of medicinal cannabis but does not support legalization for recreational use, proposing instead that "we should work more to ensure that addicts get the care they need".

In 2013, Centre Party Youth (CUF) announced their advocacy for the legalization of cannabis. Among their justifications are the idea that the ban leads to greater harm than the drug itself, that prohibition favors organized crime, and that possession and controlled sale of alcohol is already legal. The Moderate Youth League and the Liberal Youth of Sweden together with CUF all support the legalization of cannabis. Young Left and the Young Greens both support the decriminalization of the drug. The Swedish Social Democratic Youth League support investigation into the potential legalization of cannabis, while the Young Swedes SDU and the Young Christian Democrats oppose legalization of any kind.

As part of the Pirate Party's 2022 election manifesto it stated its support for legalising cannabis in Sweden and creating a regulated market for it. It stated this would use state monopolies or licenses in a similar way to how alcohol and tobacco is regulated in the country. The party said this would "deprive criminal organisations of income from drug sales and free up police resources that instead could be used to fight crimes with human victims."

Cannabis culture

Regional slang names for cannabis

Flower/fruit
 Grälle
 Gräs
 Gröning
 Grönt
 Marre
 Maja
 Ört
 Äzi
 Jazztobak 
 Hash
 Böj
 Braj
 Brass
 Brownie
 Brunt
 Knatch, knätch
 Svart
 Zattla
 Zütt

References